Lorenzo James Fluxá Cross (born 23 November 2004), otherwise known as Lorenzo Fluxá Jr. or simply Lorenzo Fluxá, is a Spanish-British racing driver, who currently drives for R-ace GP in the 2022 Formula Regional European Championship.

Career

Karting 
Having won the Balearic Karting Championship in 2016, Fluxá moved into the national championship as well as international competitions during the same year. Following a full season spent driving in the Mini and Cadet categories, where he managed to finish fourth overall in his homeland, the Spaniard would move into OK Junior in 2018, competing in the European Championship for Lennox and qualifying for the final in the World Championship. He ended his karting career in 2019, having competed in the OK Senior class.

Lower formulae 
Fluxá made his car racing debut in the Formula 4 UAE Championship in 2020 with Xcel Motorsport. He won two races and finished on the podium eleven times throughout the campaign, being beaten only by teammate Francesco Pizzi, who won the title with 300 points to Fluxá's 274.

That year Fluxá also competed in the F4 Spanish Championship with GRS. The Spaniard achieved sixth place in the drivers' standings, helping his team to finish fourth in the teams' championship with 99 points compared to the total of 26 scored by his three teammates.

F3 Asian Championship 
The Spanish driver raced in the 2021 F3 Asian Championship for BlackArts Racing. He scored 25 points and finished 14th in the standings, three positions ahead of teammate Rafael Villagómez, but also five places behind his other full-time teammate Cem Bölükbaşı.

Formula Regional European Championship

2021 
In February 2021 it was announced that Fluxá would be making his debut in the Formula Regional European Championship with Van Amersfoort Racing, partnering F4 UAE title rival Francesco Pizzi and Mari Boya. His best race finish would end up being a twelfth place at a rain-affected race in Belgium, as the Spaniard finished 25th in the championship, being the only Van Amersfoort driver to not score any points.

2022 

At the beginning of 2022, Fluxá took part in the newly rebranded Formula Regional Asian Championship, driving for 3Y by R-ace GP. Having scored a podium during the first round, Fluxá finished tenth in the championship.

For his main campaign Fluxá would move to R-ace GP, remaining in the Formula Regional European series. His season started in strong fashion, as he took his first podium in the series at the season opening race at Monza. However, following a late coming-together with teammate Gabriel Bortoleto in Race 2, the Spaniard would have to wait for two rounds until scoring his next points, a pair of eighth-placed finishes at Le Castellet. More points followed at Spa-Francorchamps, where Fluxá managed to finish fifth, before getting two points at the events in Austria and Spain respectively. He finished his season with another fifth place, this time at Mugello, which meant that Fluxá ended up twelfth in the standings, behind his teammates Hadrien David and Bortoleto.

2023 
At the beginning of 2023, Fluxá will take part in the 2023 Formula Regional Middle East Championship with Mumbai Falcons for the full season.

For his main campaign, Fluxá remained in the championship for a third successive season in 2023, switching to Prema Racing to partner Andrea Kimi Antonelli and Rafael Câmara.

FIA Formula 3 Championship 
In late September 2022, Fluxá partook in the FIA Formula 3 post-season test with Van Amersfoort Racing during the second and third days.

Personal life 
Fluxá comes from a wealthy family which founded and owns notable Spanish companies Iberostar,  and Camper. His younger siblings Lucas and Luna currently compete in karting.

Karting record

Karting career summary

Complete CIK-FIA Karting European Championship results 
(key) (Races in bold indicate pole position) (Races in italics indicate fastest lap)

Racing record

Racing career summary

* Season still in progress.

Complete Formula 4 UAE Championship results 
(key) (Races in bold indicate pole position; races in italics indicate fastest lap)

Complete F4 Spanish Championship results 
(key) (Races in bold indicate pole position) (Races in italics indicate fastest lap)

Complete Formula Regional Asian Championship results
(key) (Races in bold indicate pole position) (Races in italics indicate fastest lap)

Complete Formula Regional European Championship results 
(key) (Races in bold indicate pole position) (Races in italics indicate fastest lap)

* Season still in progress.

Complete Formula Regional Middle East Championship results
(key) (Races in bold indicate pole position) (Races in italics indicate fastest lap)

* Season still in progress.

References

External links 
 
  (in Spanish)

2004 births
Living people
Spanish racing drivers
Italian F4 Championship drivers
Spanish F4 Championship drivers
F3 Asian Championship drivers
Formula Regional Asian Championship drivers
Formula Regional European Championship drivers
Van Amersfoort Racing drivers
R-ace GP drivers
Karting World Championship drivers
24H Series drivers
Prema Powerteam drivers
UAE F4 Championship drivers
Mumbai Falcons drivers
BlackArts Racing drivers
Formula Regional Middle East Championship drivers